Geneviève Brossard de Beaulieu (fl. c. 1770 - 1815) was a French painter. She was born at La Rochelle and studied painting under Jean-Baptiste Greuze. She established herself as a successful artist, specializing in historical and mythological genres and portraiture. She ran a school at Lille, Belgium, in Flanders, until the outbreak of the French Revolution.
With the restoration of the Bourbons (1814–1815) she was granted a state pension. Several of her works survive, including a portrait of Princess Elisabeth Lubomirksa which remains in the National Museum of Warsaw in Poland.

References

G. Greer, The Obstacle Race (1979)

1770 births
1815 deaths
French women painters
18th-century French painters
18th-century French women artists
19th-century French painters
19th-century French women artists